Kingdon Gould may refer to:
Kingdon Gould Sr. (1887–1945), financier and polo player
Kingdon Gould Jr. (1924–2018), former ambassador, businessman, and philanthropist
Kingdon Gould III (born 1948), American real estate developer